The Bank of Crete was a bank that functioned between 1899 and 1918.

History
Following the departure of the Ottoman Empire's forces in December 1898, the government of the autonomous Cretan State, under Eleftherios Venizelos, established the Bank of Crete (Banque du Crète) with the assistance of the National Bank of Greece and Hambros Brothers on 30 September 1899. In addition to the functions of commercial and mortgage banking, the bank received the exclusive privilege, for thirty years, of issuing banknotes in the island of Crete. The National Bank of Greece wholly acquired, and subsumed the Bank of Crete in 1919.

References

Defunct banks of Greece
Cretan State
Banks established in 1899
Establishments in the Cretan State
Banks disestablished in 1919
1919 disestablishments in Greece
1899 establishments in the Cretan State
1919 mergers and acquisitions